Echinanthera cephalostriata  is a species of snake of the family Colubridae. The species is endemic to Brazil.

References

Echinanthera
Endemic fauna of Brazil
Reptiles of Brazil
Reptiles described in 1996